Furnace Run is a tributary of Shamokin Creek in Northumberland County, Pennsylvania, in the United States. It is impaired by sedimentation and siltation from urban runoff and storm sewers, but is not impacted by mine drainage. Reaches of the stream have been entirely enclosed. Furnace Run is named after a furnace that was built in the area in 1825. The stream is designated as a Coldwater Fishery and a Migratory Fishery.

Course
Furnace Run begins in a small lake in Coal Township, in the census-designated place of Fairview-Ferndale. It flows east-northeast for its entire length, almost immediately entering the census-designated place of Edgewood. Several tenths of a mile further downstream, the stream enters Shamokin and reaches its confluence with Shamokin Creek.

Hydrology
Furnace Run is designated as an impaired waterbody. The cause of the impairment is sedimentation and siltation. The source of the impairment is urban runoff and storm sewers. As of 2006, a total maximum daily load is needed. Discharges of raw sewage also have entered the stream. However, it is not seriously impacted by mine drainage; there are no acid mine drainage discharges in the watershed.

The pH of Furnace Run ranges from 6.6 to 7.5, with an average of 6.9, making it one of the few headwaters tributaries of Shamokin Creek to meet the pH standards of the Pennsylvania Department of Environmental Protection.

Furnace Run could experience flow augmentation. Mine seepage has contributed flow to the stream. However, in the 1950s, it was diverted into underground mines, reducing the stream's ability to carry away waste in its channel.

Geography, geology, and watershed

There is an anticlinal in the vicinity of Furnace Run. Bog ore has historically been extracted in the vicinity of the stream. Some reaches of the stream have been fully enclosed.

The stream is entirely within the United States Geological Survey quadrangle of Shamokin.

History
Furnace Run was entered into the Geographic Names Information System on August 2, 1979. Its identifier in the Geographic Names Information System is 1175361.

Coal mining was being occasionally done in the vicinity of Furnace Run by 1825. Henry Myers constructed an iron furnace on the stream in 1825 on land purchased from Solomon Dunkelberger.

Furnace Run experienced flooding in 2011.

Biology
The drainage basin of Furnace Run is designated as a Coldwater Fishery and a Migratory Fishery. In 1999 and 2000, no fish were observed at one site on the stream.

The concentration of coliform bacteria in Furnace Run was more than 3000 colonies per 100 milliliters in 1999. The concentration of E. coli in the stream was also more than 3000 colonies per 100 milliliters.

See also
Trout Run (Shamokin Creek), next tributary of Shamokin Creek going downstream
Carbon Run, next tributary of Shamokin Creek going upstream
List of rivers of Pennsylvania
List of tributaries of Shamokin Creek

References

Rivers of Northumberland County, Pennsylvania
Tributaries of Shamokin Creek
Rivers of Pennsylvania